Andrea Keszler (born 28 July 1989) is a Hungarian short-track speed-skater.

Keszler competed at the 2010 Winter Olympics for Hungary. She was a member of the Hungarian 3000 metre relay team, which finished fourth in the semifinals and second in the B Final, ending up fifth overall.

As of 2013, Keszler's best finish at the World Championships, is 6th, in 2009 as part of the Hungarian 3000 metre relay team. Her best individual performance at a World Championships came in 2013, when she placed 22nd in the 1000 metres. She has also won a gold medal as a member of the Hungarian relay team at the 2009 European Championships.

As of 2013, Keszler has not finished on the podium on the ISU Short Track Speed Skating World Cup. Her top World Cup ranking is 20th, in the 1000 metres in 2012–13.

References

1987 births
Living people
Hungarian female short track speed skaters
Olympic short track speed skaters of Hungary
Short track speed skaters at the 2010 Winter Olympics
Short track speed skaters at the 2014 Winter Olympics
Short track speed skaters at the 2018 Winter Olympics
People from Tatabánya
World Short Track Speed Skating Championships medalists
Universiade bronze medalists for Hungary
Universiade medalists in short track speed skating
Competitors at the 2011 Winter Universiade
Sportspeople from Komárom-Esztergom County
21st-century Hungarian women